Frederiksberghallen is an indoor sports arena in Copenhagen, Denmark primarily used for handball. The arena can hold 1,400 spectators (with a further 400 in a standing area if needed) and is home for København Håndbold.

External links
 Info at FCK Handball

F.C. Copenhagen
Sports venues in Copenhagen
Handball venues in Denmark
Indoor arenas in Denmark